Thirumangalam is a village near Lalgudi in Tiruchirappalli district in the Indian state of Tamil Nadu. Thirumangalam is located near Lalgudi, Tiruchirappalli. The town is situated on the banks of a distributary of the river Cauvery near Trichy.

External links

 

Villages in Tiruchirappalli district